The Jeamri Massacre was an event where the Imperial Japanese Army attacked Korean civilians inside a church. To cover up the mass-killings, the Japanese soldiers burned the church down. However, Canadian missionary Dr. Frank W. Schofield witnessed the aftermath of the slaughter and published a report on the event.

Background
In 1919, two million Koreans organized peaceful protests against Japanese occupation in the March 1st Movement. In retaliation, Japanese authorities sent troops to violently suppress the demonstrations.

Massacre
On April 15, in the village of Jeamri, Japanese soldiers herded 29 residents, including children, into a Methodist church before firing at the building. Afterwards, the soldiers committed arson by lighting the church on fire and killing any surviving victims; they also set fire to nearby civilian homes. Canadian doctor Frank Schofield heard news of the event and immediately visited the scene. Schofield then wrote a report titled "The Massacre of Chai-Amm-Ni" and published it in The Shanghai Gazette on May 27, 1919.

Japanese cover-up
The Japanese lieutenant responsible was disciplined, but a group of senior officers decided to attribute the incident to resistance by local people.

In his diary, Japanese commander Taro Utsunomiya wrote that the incident would hurt the reputation of the Japanese Empire and acknowledged that the Japanese soldiers committed murder and arson. Utsunomiya's diary revealed that Japanese colonial authorities met and decided to cover up the incident.

Later events
In 2019, a group of 17 Japanese Christians visited the site of the massacre and apologized for the incident on behalf of Japan.

References

1919 in Korea
Massacres in South Korea
Massacres in 1919
Imperial Japanese Army